Seoul National University School of Law (SNU Law) is one of the professional graduate schools of Seoul National University, located in Seoul, South Korea. SNU Law is widely regarded to be the most prestigious law school in South Korea.

Established in 1895 as 'Popkwan Yangsungso', it is oldest and most renowned law schools in South Korea. After legal education reform in 2009, it adopted the American model of 3-year law school system, and currently offers the J.D., J.S.D., LL.M., and Ph.D. degrees in law. Due to the establishment of the graduate J.D. program, the law school no longer admits undergraduate law students. The LL.B. program will be gradually phased out in favor of the Law School's graduate programs. SNU Law currently enrolls 150 students in each class of the J.D. program.

History 

The law school was established in its first iteration in 1895 during the Joseon Dynasty as the Judicial Officials Training Institute. Following the Gabo Reform, intended to be a sweeping reform of the Korean government, then-minister of justice Suh Kwangbom proposed creating and institution to educate judicial law. Initially, the institute served men between the ages of 25 and 30, and granted a bachelor of law.

In 1909, the institute was restructured, becoming a law school and a limited professional school. In 1911, the name and setup was again changed, and the school became Seoul Professional School. However, in 1922 it returned to being exclusively a law school, and the name was once again changed to Seoul Professional Law School.

In the early 1940s, the law school was forced to cease admitting new students due to harsh wartime policies enacted by the Japanese; however, these policies were reverted following the end of the war, and enrollment returned to normal levels.

Following the April Revolution, a student-led revolution which would lead to the end of the autocratic regime of Syngman Ree, enrollment was sharply and suddenly reduced by the government from three hundred students to one hundred and sixty, based on its assumption that the law school was the center of the protests. Enrollment stayed at this level until recovering in 1981.

Library 
Established in August 1946, the Seoul National University Law Library opened on June 30, 2014. It currently holds more than 155,055 volumes in its collection.

Notable people

Alumni 

SNU Law School's long history and outstanding status inside South Korea created numerous notable alumni around Government of South Korea including judiciary, for example, 13th President of South Korea Yoon Suk-yeol, and most of Justices and Chief Justices of the Supreme Court of Korea, such as 16th Chief Justice Kim Myeong-soo. Also, most of Justices and Presidents of the Constitutional Court of Korea are composed of SNU Law alumni, including 7th President of the Constitutional Court Yoo Nam-seok.

Criticism 
The SNU Law School has been criticized due to the lack of admitted students older than 30 years of age. The Law School was also criticized for having admitted 88.0% (810) of its students from the top three colleges of South Korea.

See also 
 Seoul National University

References

External links 
 Official website (English)

Seoul National University
Law schools in South Korea
Educational institutions established in 1895
1895 establishments in Korea